Erika Uhlig is a retired East German slalom canoeist who competed in the late 1960s. She won a silver medal in the mixed C-2 event at the 1967 ICF Canoe Slalom World Championships in Lipno nad Vltavou.

References

East German female canoeists
Living people
Year of birth missing (living people)
Medalists at the ICF Canoe Slalom World Championships